was a Japanese photographer. He was active between the mid-1920s and mid-1930s, and was a member of Los Angeles's Japanese Camera Pictorialists of California. Before returning to Japan, he worked as a photo retoucher.

References

Japanese photographers
1876 births
1943 deaths